Aldarovo (Aldar) is a rural locality (a village) in Nikifarovsky Selsoviet, Alsheyevsky District, Bashkortostan, Russia. The population was 105 as of 2010. There are 3 streets.

Geography 
Aldarovo is located 55 km southwest of Rayevsky (the district's administrative centre) by road. Balgazy is the nearest rural locality.

References 

Rural localities in Alsheyevsky District